Amara aeneopolita is a species of beetle of the genus Amara in the family Carabidae that is native to Asia.

References

aeneopolita
Beetles of Asia
Beetles described in 1918
Taxa named by Thomas Lincoln Casey Jr.